Dennis Sproul is a former quarterback in the National Football League (NFL). He was drafted by the Green Bay Packers in the eighth round of the 1978 NFL Draft and played that season with the team.

Dennis played little league baseball in Maywood California with his brother "Dale Jr." and father coach, the team was nicknamed the "Maywood Merchants", Dennis played short stop and second base. Along with friends Rick Costello, Larry Wiemers, Pete Tereshuck and Richie Robles; 

Also played quarterback for ASU;

References

Sportspeople from Downey, California
Green Bay Packers players
American football quarterbacks
Arizona State Sun Devils football players
1956 births
Living people